A Factory-kitchen or kitchen factory was a large mechanized enterprise of food service in the Soviet Union, originated in the 1920–1930s. Its main purpose was centralized preparation of food (both prefabrication and full processing) supplied for communal dining rooms or for personal purchase. Factory-kitchens were characteristic of their unique architecture. Sometimes the term is inadequately translated as communal kitchen, the latter being a kitchen in a Soviet communal apartment.

The idea of centralized food preparation was part of the emancipation of the women from the household work in early Soviet Union, and to better tap into women's workforce. Along with the house-communes, factory-kitchens were to get rid of "the yoke of the household economy". Slogans of the day were "Away with Pots and Pans!" and "The Saucepan is an Enemy of the Party Cell".

Various Soviet writers described how "a single person can prepare from fifty to hundred dinners a day". A children's book A Cook for a Whole City described in detail how efficiently a kitchen-factory works.

References

External links
Фабрика-кухня Выборгского (Сталинского) района

Architecture in the Soviet Union
Women's rights in Russia
Food industry